Nižná Kamenica is a village and municipality in Košice-okolie District in the Kosice Region of eastern Slovakia.

History
In historical records, the village was first mentioned in 1427.

Geography
The village lies at an altitude of 308 metres and covers an area of 13.325 km².
It has a population of about 500.

External links

Villages and municipalities in Košice-okolie District